A Simple Noodle Story, internationally A Woman, a Gun and a Noodle Shop. is a 2009 film directed by Zhang Yimou. Described as a cross between screwball comedy and thriller, the film stars Sun Honglei and Ni Dahong in the thriller segment while comedians Xiaoshenyang and Yan Ni star in the comedic segment.

A Chinese remake of the 1984 American film Blood Simple, the debut of the Coen brothers, whose work Yimou lists as among his favorites, the plot transports the original film's town in Texas to a noodle shop in a small desert town in Gansu province. The film has been described as a considerable departure from the director's previous works.

Premise
The abusive owner of a noodle shop in the desert in China plans the murder of his adulterous wife and her lover but it goes awry after various characters' intertwined stories lead to double crosses and fatalities.

Cast
Sun Honglei – Zhang
Ni Dahong – Wang
Xiaoshenyang – Li
Yan Ni – Wang's Wife

Production
Principal photography began in June 2009, and the film was released on December 11, 2009 in China.

Reception
The film made its international premiere in competition at the 60th Berlin International Film Festival, where it was nominated for the Golden Bear.

The film received polarizing responses from audiences, with some noting the film's visual inventiveness and non-serious tone, while others criticized the film maker's use of slapstick humor and over-the-top style. Zhang revealed at the Berlinale that the Coen brothers had written to him after seeing a copy of the film, and expressed that they loved the changes made in this version.

Derek Elley of Variety described the film as a "much more ascetic, chamber-like dramedy" that is a "pretty close adaptation" and "spiced up with some pratfall humor and visually enhanced by saturated lensing."  Elley also noted "Coen aficionados won't be surprised by any of the subsequent twists in the tale, and general auds will be pleasantly amused, as Zhang tries to manipulate events for his own purposes."

Maggie Lee of The Hollywood Reporter is more mixed on the film, and described it as "a high-rolling but garish production with untranslatable regional ribald humor", and noted the changes from the original with "pacing is much more frenetic with characters and cameras in restless motion. The intervals are crammed with exotic sight gags and colloquial wordplay, such as a dough-making scene choreographed like a plate-spinning acrobatic show or the group hip-hop dance routine."

Some critics also viewed the film as unique in Zhang's filmography. James Marsh of Twitch Film described the film as "a spectacular departure from his previous work", and praised the film's first half as "breakneck paced" and "many laughs to be had throughout", but noted "The second half takes a deliberate shift into darker territory, as those already familiar with the story will know, and while handled effectively in its own right, it does lose some of the energy generated in the first half."  However, Marsh states "that said, the film must certainly be deemed a success, both as an experimentation for the director, as an adaptation of Blood Simple and as a screwball comedy in its own right."

Edmund Lee of Time Out Hong Kong described the film as "surely one of the year's unlikeliest projects", and a "sacrilegiously funny period remake."  Lee further states: "Zhang has traded Texas' oppressively bleak vista for China's visually intoxicating desert landscape for this enthralling film, at once hilarious and cruelly ironic."

However, Perry Lam in Muse criticized it, stating: "The story unfolds in an almost surreal, suspiciously computer-generated setting that is decisively closed off to outer reality. Zhang, who usually cares deeply about his characters, loses his intense emotional command over his actors."

Geoffrey Macnab of The Independent reviewing the film at the Berlinale states "Zhang Yimou's remake of the Coen brothers' Blood Simple is exhilarating and inventive", and "Zhang's formal mastery is little short of astonishing...there are few film-makers who use colour or sound editing in such a bravura way."

The film cost approximately $12 million to make, notably less expensive than Zhang Yimou's most recent historical epics. The film, in spite of the polarized reception, was successful at the box office, and went on to gross 261 million yuan ($38 million) in less than six weeks, tripling the film's budget.

References

External links
 
  
 
 
 
 

2009 films
Chinese comedy-drama films
Chinese crime thriller films
2000s Mandarin-language films
Films directed by Zhang Yimou
Chinese remakes of foreign films
Sony Pictures Classics films
Films set in China
2000s English-language films